NORCAT (known formerly as the "Northern Centre for Advanced Technology") is a not for profit technology and innovation centre headquartered in Greater Sudbury, Ontario, Canada. NORCAT provides health and safety training for the mining industry, occupational health and safety services, and product development assistance to small, medium and large industrial enterprises.

History

NORCAT was created by Cambrian College dean Darryl Lake as part of a job-retention strategy to help employ local graduates and keep them in the Greater Sudbury area. Lake was inspired by the innovation centers in Finland, including Technopolis Oyj, and with former Cambrian College president Glenn Crombie, adapted a model to apply to Northern Ontario.

NORCAT was incorporated on March 28, 1995, operating in Cambrian College with a training centre in downtown Sudbury. On October 23, 1998, the Honourable Chris Hodgson, Minister of Northern Development and Mines and Chair of the Northern Ontario Heritage Fund Corporation Corporation opened NORCAT's 32,000-square-foot facility, located on the Cambrian College campus. With laboratory and shop space leased at full capacity to local mine technology companies, NORCAT’s Innovation and Commercialization Centre was conceived. With donations from local mining companies and funding from the federal and provincial government, the new Innovation and Commercialization Centre opened in 2009 on the grounds of Cambrian College. Since its opening, 2 expansions have been added to the building to meet the demand for shop space.

Services
NORCAT offers a number of services to support the different objectives of the centre. To support the technology development, occupational health and safety services and specialized mine training programs provide financial solvency for the centre.

Specialized mine training
The centre provides health and safety training programs to mining companies, contractors and other organizations, including Common Core training, Contractor Orientation and Workplace Hazardous Materials Information System training. These programs are delivered at the centre, at their Underground Mine Centre and online with the eLearning program.

Underground Mine Centre
NORCAT provides access to one of the few training mines in North America. The Underground Centre was opened in November 1997, in the Falconbridge (Xstrata Nickel) owned Fecunis Adit mine in Onaping, Ontario. The mine provides practical mine training, testing space for mine technology prototypes, and an underground setting for photographing and filming mine technology in a controlled underground setting.

In 2015 NORCAT made major investments in the Underground Centre, partnering with local and international mining supply companies to showcase their products, as well as upgrading their facilities to include new dries and meeting rooms for rent.

Occupational health and safety services
NORCAT’s Health and Safety Resource Centre offers consulting services and training programs. The centre provides expertise in issues ranging from toxicology, confined space awareness, handling dangerous goods and personal protection equipment. NORCAT also provides monitoring for airborne chemical hazards, indoor environmental quality assessment and monitoring of molds and bioaerosols for schools, offices and homes.

Innovation and commercialization (The Innovation Mill)
NORCAT assists small and medium enterprises with their development by providing access to laboratories, office space and specific expertise. This allows SMEs to build and develop their products without extensive overhead and operational constraints. The centre is a member of the Ontario Network of Entrepreneurs, a collaboration of organizations designed to help commercialize products and services with educational programs, advisory services, and financing.

In 2014, the regional innovation centre was rebranded as the “NORCAT Innovation Mill”, which continued to offer support to SMEs through the Ontario Network of Entrepreneurs. The Innovation Mill also hosts the Sudbury wing of the Entrepreneurship 101 business fundamentals course (developed by the MaRS Discovery District) as well as several business-pitch events for start-up companies to gain exposure to angel investors.

In 2018, the "NORCAT Innovation Mill" was rebranded as NORCAT Innovation.

References

Non-profit organizations based in Ontario
Organizations established in 1995
Organizations based in Greater Sudbury
Occupational safety and health organizations